Hopfield may refer to:
 A field used for cultivating hops
 Hopfield net, a type of neural network
 John Joseph Hopfield (born 1933), American biologist and physicist, inventor of the Hopfield net
 John J. Hopfield (spectroscopist) (1891–1953), American spectroscopist, with several eponymous spectral details:
 Hopfield bands, one of the important molecular oxygen absorption bands
 Lyman–Birge–Hopfield bands (LBH bands), one of the important molecular nitrogen absorption bands
 Hopfield continuum, a band in the  emission spectrum of helium

See also:
 Adventure in the Hopfields, a 1954 black and white short (60 min) film, directed by John Guillermin and written by John Cresswell, thought to have been lost until 2002 when an American film fan found a copy in a rubbish skip outside a Chicago television studio